"The Lace Counter" is the 24th television play episode of the first season of the Australian anthology television series Australian Playhouse. "The Lace Counter" was written by Pat Flower and originally aired on ABC on 26 September 1966.

Plot
Miss Peach and Mrs Plum, meet across the Lace counter in a department store and discover that both sides of the counter yield elusive truths.

Cast
 Ruth Cracknell as Miss Peach
 Aileen Britton as Mrs Plum 
 Noel Brophy as Mr Prune

Production
Flower originally wrote this and Easy Terms for Robin Lovejoy's lunchtime theatre program. This program folded before Lovejoy even read them but once he did he recommended them to the ABC and Crowley became the main contributing writer to season one of Australian Playhouse. It was shot in Sydney.

Reception
The Age gave it a poor review.

References

External links
 
 

1966 television plays
1966 Australian television episodes
1960s Australian television plays
Australian Playhouse (season 1) episodes